Richard Ellis (1781 – December 20, 1846) was an American plantation owner, politician, and judge on the Fourth Circuit Court of Alabama. He was president of the Convention of 1836 that declared Texas' independence from Mexico and he signed the Texas Declaration of Independence. Later, Ellis served in the Republic of Texas legislature.

Ellis was born and raised in the tidewater region of Virginia, but he settled in Alabama. He was a member of Alabama’s Constitutional Convention in 1818 and an associate justice of the Alabama Supreme Court (1819–1826).

Ellis settled in Mexican Texas in 1834, defying the ban on immigration by the Mexican government, establishing a plantation in what is now Bowie County. In 1836 he was unanimously elected president of the Texas constitutional convention that declared independence on March 2, 1836. He also held the convention together for the additional seventeen days needed to draft Texas's constitution. He then served the Republic of Texas as a Senator from 1836 to 1840 in the first four congresses.

Ellis died in Bowie County in 1846, but in 1929, he and his wife, Mary West Dandridge were reinterred in the State Cemetery at Austin, Texas.

Ellis County, Texas, is named in his honor.

References

Justices of the Supreme Court of Alabama
Republic of Texas Senators
1st Congress of the Republic of Texas
1781 births
1846 deaths
People of the Texas Revolution
People from Lunenburg County, Virginia
People from Bowie County, Texas
Signers of the Texas Declaration of Independence
19th-century American judges